Kamil Václav Zvelebil (November 17, 1927 – January 17, 2009) was a Czech scholar in Indian literature and linguistics, notably Tamil, Sanskrit, Dravidian linguistics and literature and philology.

Life and career 
Zvelebil studied at the Charles University in Prague from 1946 to 1952 where he majored in Indology, English, literature and philosophy. After obtaining his PhD in 1952 and until 1970 he was a senior research fellow in Tamil and Dravidian linguistics and literature at the Oriental Institute of the Czechoslovak Academy of Sciences. He held the role of associate professor of Tamil and Dravidian at Charles University in Prague until 1968, when he and his family (including his son, the later archaeologist, Marek Zvelebil) were forced to flee after the Warsaw Pact invasion of Czechoslovakia. They fled to the United States at first, but later settled in the Netherlands.

During the late 1960s, he made many field trips including those to South India. From 1965 to 1966, he was a temporary professor in Dravidian studies at the University of Chicago in the United States and was a visiting professor at Heidelberg University between 1967 and 1968. Furthermore, he is very well known among the scholars in Tamil Nadu and has earned a permanent place in the educational syllabus of the Dravidian states.

In 1970, after more time at the University of Chicago, he was a visiting professor at the Collège de France in Paris. After more travel through European universities he became the professor of Dravidian linguistics and South Indian literature and culture at Utrecht University until his retirement in 1992.

Zvelebil also made the only known translation of the Tirukkuṛaḷ into Czech. It included some selections that appeared in Novy Orient, a Czech journal, during 1952–54.

Books
He has authored numerous books and articles on Dravidian linguistics and literature.
Some of them are:

Comparative Dravidian Phonology, Published by Mouton, ASIN: B0006BZAIK
Dravidian Linguistics: An Introduction, PILC (Pondicherry Institute of Linguistics and Culture), 1990
Tamil Literature, E.J. Brill, Leiden, 1975, 
Companion Studies to the History of Tamil Literature, Handbuch Der Orientalistik Series, Brill Academic Publishers, 
The Smile of Murugan: On Tamil Literature of South India, Brill Academic Publishers (not to be confused with Michael Wood's book "The smile of Murugan: a south Indian journey")
The Poets of the Powers: Magic, Freedom, and Renewal, 
Literary Conventions in Akam Poetry
Two Tamil Folktales: The Story of King Matanakama, the Story of Peacock Ravana, UNESCO Collection of Representative Works: Indian Series, 
Lexicon of Tamil Literature, Handbuch Der Orientalistik, Brill Academic Publishers
Nilgiri areal studies, Acta Universitatis Carolinae, Charles University in Prague, Karolinum Press, 1st ed edition (2001), 
Introducing Tamil literature, ASIN: B0007JK3TC
Ananda-tandava of Siva-sadanrttamurti: The development of the concept of Atavallan-Kuttaperumanatikal in the South Indian textual and iconographic tradition, Institute of Asian Studies; 1st ed edition (1985), ASIN: B0006EL29I
Introduction to the Historical Grammar of the Tamil Language, Oriental Institute in Academia (1970), ASIN: B0006CIL44
The Irulas of the Blue Mountains, Foreign & Comparative Studies (June 1988), 
 Tamulica et Dravidica: A Selection of Papers on Tamil and Dravidian Linguistics, Prague: KAROLINUM/CHARLES UNIVERSITY PRESS, 1998

Bibliography
Kamil Zvelebil has authored more than 500 bibliographic items including books, articles and reviews and translations.

See also
 List of translators
 Tirukkural translations into Czech

References

Further reading
Zvelebil, Kamil., Dravidian Linguistics: An Introduction", PILC (Pondicherry Institute of Linguistics and Culture), 1990
Zvelebil, Kamil., Tamil Literature'', E.J. Brill, Leiden, 1975,

External links
 Prof. Dr. Kamil Vaclav Zvelebil (tamilnation.org bio)
 Prof. Dr. Kamil Vaclav Zvelebil (marketaz.co.uk bio)
 Bibliography of Prof. Dr. K.V. Zvelebil (digilib.phil.muni.cz)
https://www.dutchstudies-satsea.nl/deelnemers/zvelebil-kamil-veith/
https://data.bnf.fr/en/12026532/kamil_zvelebil/

1927 births
Linguists from the Czech Republic
Czech philologists
Dravidologists
2009 deaths
Tamil scholars of non-Tamil background
Charles University alumni
Tamil–Czech translators
Czech Indologists
Translators of the Tirukkural into Czech
20th-century linguists
20th-century philologists
20th-century translators
Tirukkural translators
Academic staff of the Collège de France